Andrew Welsh Imbrie (April 6, 1921 – December 5, 2007) was an American contemporary classical music composer and pianist.

Career
Imbrie was born in New York City and began his musical training as a pianist when he was 4. In 1937, he went to Paris to study composition briefly with Nadia Boulanger and piano with Robert Casadesus. He returned to the United States the next year to attend Princeton University where he studied with Roger Sessions, receiving his undergraduate degree in 1942. His senior thesis there, a string quartet, was recorded by the Juilliard Quartet. During World War II he served in the U.S. Army as a Japanese translator. Afterwards, he went to the University of California, Berkeley, where he received an M.A. in Music in 1947; there he continued to study with Sessions, who had taken a position at Berkeley.

Imbrie taught composition, theory, and analysis at Berkeley from 1949 until his retirement in 1991. In the summer of 1991, he was Composer-in-Residence at Tanglewood in Lenox, Massachusetts.

In addition to his principal teaching job at Berkeley, he served as a visiting professor at the University of Chicago, Brandeis University, Northwestern University, New York University, the University of Alabama, and Harvard University, and had a regular teaching post at the San Francisco Conservatory.

He died at his home in Berkeley, California at the age of 86.

His notable students include Larry Austin, Tamar Diesendruck, Richard Festinger, Alden Jenks, Frank La Rocca, Neil Rolnick, Allen Shearer, Laura Schwendinger, Nils Frykdahl, Kurt Rohde, Hi Kyung Kim, Leslie Wildman and Carolyn Yarnell.

Style

Imbrie's style was influenced early by Béla Bartók, and then by Roger Sessions, his teacher at both Princeton and Berkeley. Imbrie preferred harmony that was non-triadic, or if triadic, non-functional, and a tightly organized, often atonal, contrapuntal texture with attention to careful motivic development; he avoided the serial techniques that dominated art music composition after the Second World War. Imbrie was also attentive to melodic line and shape to make a free atonal language accessible.

Selected compositions
Imbrie's body of work spans many genres. His chief works are:

 Three Against Christmas (1960 opera)
 Angle of Repose (1976 opera)
 Dandelion Wine (1961 for chamber ensemble)
 To a Traveler (1971 for chamber ensemble)
 Sextet for Six Friends (2007 for chamber ensemble)
 Drumtaps for chorus with orchestra (text by Whitman)
 Prometheus Bound for chorus with orchestra (text by Green after Aeschylus)
 Adam for chorus with orchestra (text from medieval and Civil War sources)
 Requiem (1984, chorus with orchestra)
 Three symphonies
 Eight concertos
 Songs for voice
 Sonatas for various instruments
 Chamber works for diverse instrumental ensembles
 Works for choral ensembles
 Five string quartets

Recordings

First Recordings of Two Naumburg Award Compositions. Columbia Records, MS 6597
Violin Concerto
Andrew Imbrie. New York: Composers Recordings Inc., 1973. Rereleased, New World Records, 2007.
Symphony No. 3
Serenade for flute, viola and piano
Sonata for cello and piano
New Music for Virtuosos. New York: New World Records, 1977.
Three Sketches
Andrew Imbrie and Gunther Schuller. New York: New World Records, 1978.
String Quartet No. 4
New Music Series Vol. 3. Neuma Records, 1993
Short Story
Collage New Music. Boston: GM Recordings, 1989.
Pilgrimage
Andrew Imbrie. Boston: GM Recordings, 1993.
String Quartets 4 & 5
Impromptu for Violin and Piano
Music of Andrew Imbrie. New York: CRI, 1994.
Symphony No. 3
Serenade for Flute, Viola and Piano
Sonata for cello and piano
Dream Sequence – Chamber Music of Andrew Imbrie. New York: New World Records, 1995.
Dream Sequence
Roethke Songs
Three Piece Suite
Campion Songs
To a Traveler
Andrew Imbrie, Requiem. New Rochelle, NY: Bridge Records, 2000.
Requiem
Piano Concerto No. 3
Andrew Imbrie. Albany, NY: Albany Records, 2002.
Spring Fever
Chicago Bells
Songs of Then and Now

References

Sources
 Ann P. Basart, Martin Brody: "Andrew Imbrie", Grove Music Online, ed. L. Macy (Accessed July 21, 2006) 
Kennedy, Michael (2006), The Oxford Dictionary of Music, 985 pages,

External links
Imbrie's San Francisco Conservatory Of Music faculty page
Collage page about Andrew Imbrie and his music
Art of the States: Andrew Imbrie three works by the composer
Andrew Imbrie interview, April 26, 1986

1921 births
2007 deaths
20th-century classical composers
American male classical composers
American classical composers
Princeton University alumni
University of California, Berkeley alumni
University of Chicago faculty
Brandeis University faculty
Northwestern University faculty
New York University faculty
University of Alabama faculty
Harvard University staff
University of California, Berkeley College of Letters and Science faculty
San Francisco Conservatory of Music faculty
21st-century classical composers
Members of the American Academy of Arts and Letters
Musicians from New York City
Pupils of Roger Sessions
21st-century American composers
20th-century American composers
20th-century American male musicians